The 2022 MBC Drama Awards, presented by Munhwa Broadcasting Corporation (MBC) took place at MBC Media Center Public Hall in Sangam-dong, Mapo-gu, Seoul on December 30, 2022. It was aired from 20:50 (KST) on iMBC official website and Naver Now.

Kim Sung-joo hosted the award ceremony third year in succession with Choi Soo-young. The Grand Prize (Daesang) was won by Lee Jong-suk and award for Best drama of the year went to Big Mouth.

Winners and nominees

Winners denoted in bold

Presenters

Performance 
 Itzy – "Cheshire + Sneakers"

See also
 2022 KBS Drama Awards
 2022 SBS Drama Awards

References

External links
 

2022 television awards
MBC Drama Awards
2022 in South Korean television
December 2022 events in South Korea
MBC TV original programming